The 2008 Arizona State Sun Devils football team represented Arizona State University in the 2008 NCAA Division I FBS football season. They played their home games at Sun Devil Stadium in Tempe, Arizona.

After the loss to Arizona in the Territorial Cup Arizona State did qualify for a bowl game for the first time since the 2003 season.

Before the season

Recruiting 
See .

Schedule

Roster

Coaching staff

Game summaries

Northern Arizona

Stanford

UNLV

Georgia

California

USC

Oregon

Oregon State

Washington

Washington State

UCLA

Arizona

Rankings

Statistics

Team

Scores by quarter

Offense

Rushing

Passing

Receiving

Defense

Special teams

References

Arizona State
Arizona State Sun Devils football seasons
Arizona State Sun Devils football